Canoeing and Kayaking at the 2005 Southeast Asian Games was held at the Malawaan Fishing Area of the Subic Bay Freeport Zone in Zambales, Philippines.

The participants competed for 7 gold medals.

Medal table

Medalists

Men

Women

External links
Southeast Asian Games Official Results

2005 Southeast Asian Games events